Parachrostia yoshimotoi is a moth of the family Erebidae first described by Michael Fibiger in 2008. It is known from Taiwan and along the eastern and south-eastern coast of China.

Adults have been found from the beginning of April to the end of September, suggesting several generations per year.

The wingspan is 10.5–12 mm. The forewing is relatively narrow, with a bright, ovoid, yellow reniform stigma. The crosslines are all present, black and waved. The terminal line is marked by tight black interveinal spots. The hindwing is grey, with an indistinct discal spot. The underside of the forewing is brownish and beige, without a pattern. The underside of the hindwing is brownish and light grey, with a discal spot.

References

Micronoctuini
Taxa named by Michael Fibiger
Moths described in 2008